Golden West College (GWC) is a public community college in Huntington Beach, California.

Organization
Golden West College, Orange Coast College, and Coastline Community College comprise the Coast Community College District (CCCD). The district is a regional organization providing administrative services and funding for post-secondary education. The state of California charters the CCCD to provide community college services.

Clubs
GWC possesses several clubs on campus for students to join. The C.A.R.E. CLUB is for single mothers dedicated to their children and their education. The California Nursing Student Association (CNSA) is to increase professional awareness and the growth of nursing students. The Peace & Leadership Club is for creating a culture of peace. Also the Alpha Gamma Sigma Honor Society - Sigma Pi Chapter is the longest existing organization/club on campus since 1969.

Academics
The mission of GWC is to provide inexpensive education in the trades, licensed trades and skilled professions, as well as remedial and transferable lower-division courses for students who plan to transfer to either a California State University, a campus of the University of California, or another university.

Athletics
GoldenWest is widely known for its success in athletics throughout the state of California.  They have won many California State Community College Championships.
California State Community College Championships
 Women's Basketball: 1979, 1990, 1991
 Field Hockey: 1980
 Women's Gymnastics: 1979, 1981
 Men's Soccer: 1977
 Softball:1975, 1979, 1981, 1983, 1984
 Men's Swimming: 1985,1986, 1990, 1993, 1995, 1996, 1997, 1998, 1999, 2000, 2001, 2004, 2014, 2015, 2017
 Women's Swimming: 1999, 2000, 2001, 2013
 Men's Surfing: 1979
 Women's Tennis: 1980
 Men's Track Shot Put: 2010
 Women's Track Hammer: 2010
 Men's Volleyball: 1995, 1996, 1997, 1998, 1999, 2013
 Women's Volleyball: 1979, 1984, 1988, 1990, 1991, 1993, 1994, 1995, 1996, 1997,1998, 1999, 2000, 2001, 2002, 2003, 2004
 Men's Water Polo: 1976, 1978, 1979, 1980, 1981, 1982, 1985, 1989, 1990, 1991, 1992, 1993, 1994, 1995, 1996, 1997, 2001, 2002, 2008, 2009, 2011
 Women's Water Polo: 1997, 1998, 1999, 2000, 2002, 2009

Golden West's softball team has appeared in one Women's College World Series in 1974 at the college level (losing to Kansas and Weber State). Golden West also won the AIAW junior/community college national championship in 1975, 1976 and 1977. The 1975 title came in a perfect game, 22–0 victory over Northeastern Colorado, shortened to 5 innings by the mercy rule.

Notable alumni

Patty Cardenas – silver medalist at the 2008 Summer Olympics in water polo
D-Loc – MC in the rap rock group Kottonmouth Kings
Vivica A. Fox – actress 
Doug Gottlieb – basketball analyst and sports talk radio host 
Jack Haley – professional basketball player (NBA 1988–1998)
Jesse Juarez – JUCO All-American and California JC state champion wrestler; an American mixed martial artist
Paul McBeth – 5-time PDGA World Champion; professional disc golfer
James McDonald – professional baseball pitcher (MLB 2008–2013)
John Moses – professional baseball outfielder (MLB 1982–1992)
Steve Oedekerk - actor, comedian, and filmmaker
Tito Ortiz – 2-time NJCAA State Champion wrestler; professional mixed martial artist, former UFC Light Heavyweight Champion, UFC Hall of Fame member
Glenn Parker – professional football player (NFL 1990–2001)
Michelle Pfeiffer – actress
Joseph Santos – artist and painter
Jonathan Uyloan – professional basketball player (international 2009–2018)
Nicky Youre, singer and songwriter

References

External links

 
California Community Colleges
Education in Huntington Beach, California
Educational institutions established in 1965
Schools accredited by the Western Association of Schools and Colleges
Sports in Huntington Beach, California
William Pereira buildings
1965 establishments in California
Two-year colleges in the United States